Marcia Ann McDermott (born August 16, 1965) is an American soccer executive, coach, and former player, who is currently a technical advisor for Sky Blue FC of the National Women's Soccer League. She most recently coached the Army Black Knights women's soccer team for five seasons until 2017.

Playing career
In her youth, McDermott played in the Washington Area Girls Soccer League and Virginia Youth Soccer Association Olympic Development Program. She played for the McLean Highlanders in high school, where she was selected in the all-metropolitan team. She also participated in basketball and field hockey at McLean, and was chosen as the team's most valuable player in both sports. In college, she played for the North Carolina Tar Heels from 1983 to 1986. The team won the national championship in three of the seasons (1983, 1984, and 1986). During her career with the Tar Heels, she scored 26 goals and recorded 46 assists in 89 matches. She was an NSCAA First-Team All-American in 1986, and was included in the NCAA All-Tournament Team in 1983, 1985, and 1986.

Coaching career
McDermott has spent 30 years coaching women's soccer, including positions with the North Carolina-Greensboro, the University of Maryland, the University of Arkansas, Northwestern University, the University of Illinois, the Carolina Courage, the Chicago Red Stars, the U. S. Women's National Soccer Team (USWNT), and the United States Military Academy. She has also served as a scout for Illinois and the USWNT. In 2010, she briefly served as the interim coach of the Chicago Red Stars.

She coached teams that won gold medals at the 2008 Summer Olympics and the 2012 Summer Olympics as an assistant coach with the USWNT.

McDermott was active in the National Soccer Coaches Association of America (NSCAA), having served on the women's committee (1994–2000), board of directors (1999–2000), executive committee (2006–2011), and as president (2010–2011).

Awards
McDermott was included in the ACC 50th Anniversary Women's Soccer Team in 2002. She was inducted into the Virginia–D.C. Soccer Hall of Fame in 2009, and the McLean High School Athletic Hall of Fame in 2011. In 2016, the NSCAA announced that they would honor McDermott with the Women's Soccer Award of Excellence.

Personal life
McDermott graduated from the University of North Carolina at Chapel Hill in 1987 with a Bachelor of Arts in English.

Career statistics

International

References

1965 births
Living people
Sportspeople from Lafayette, Indiana
Soccer players from Indiana
Soccer players from Virginia
American women's soccer coaches
Army Black Knights women's soccer coaches
Maryland Terrapins women's soccer coaches
Arkansas Razorbacks women's soccer coaches
Northwestern Wildcats women's soccer coaches
North Carolina Tar Heels women's soccer players
Chicago Red Stars coaches
American women's soccer players
Women's association football midfielders
Women's association football defenders
United States women's international soccer players
Female association football managers
Presidents of United Soccer Coaches
Illinois Fighting Illini women's soccer coaches
UNC Greensboro Spartans women's soccer coaches
Women's United Soccer Association coaches
NJ/NY Gotham FC non-playing staff
Women's Professional Soccer coaches